I Am Not What I Am is the first full release from Young and in the Way. It was self-released on March 24, 2011. It was rereleased in 2012 with the bands Amen EP.

Track listing
 "That Is Not Dead Which Can Eternal Lie" - 5:54   
 "And We Have Killed Him" - 1:24   
 "Leaving Nothing but the Absence of Everything" - 2:00   
 "If Only That So Many Dead Lie Round" - 1:18   
 "Death Is Eager to Hold You" - 1:37   
 "They Should Greet Me With Howls of Execration" - 2:28   
 "With Strange Aeons Even Death May Die" - 1:18   
 "I Am Not What I Am" - 2:49   
 "Love and Terror Laid the Stone" - 1:54   
 "The Chaotic and Bloody World Around Us" - 1:57   
 "Ascending the White Mountain" - 5:19

References

External links
Amazon.com Page

2011 albums
Young and in the Way albums